All Out for Kangaroo Valley is a British TV movie about Australians living in London, shown on BBC1 (as part of The Wednesday Play anthology series) on 5 November 1969.

The play was reportedly controversial.

Plot
Robbo arrives from Australia with his fiancée Jan. They meet his cousin Col, who introduces them to Liz.

Cast
Sandra Gleeson as Jan
Mark Edwards as Robert
Kerry Francis as Nev
Vivienne Lincoln as Carol
David Gilchrist as Jim
Warwick Sims as Colin
Betty McDowall as Liz
Peter Arne as Peter Steiner
Joanne Dainton as Emma Steiner
Brian Harrison as Joe
Cassandra Harris

References

External links

All Out for Kangaroo Valley at BFI

British drama films
1969 television films
1969 films
1960s English-language films
1960s British films